Post-traumatic stress disorder (PTSD) is a mental and behavioral disorder that can develop because of exposure to a traumatic event, such as sexual assault, warfare, traffic collisions, child abuse, domestic violence, or other threats on a person's life. Symptoms may include disturbing thoughts, feelings, or dreams related to the events, mental or physical distress to trauma-related cues, attempts to avoid trauma-related cues, alterations in the way a person thinks and feels, and an increase in the fight-or-flight response. These symptoms last for more than a month after the event. Young children are less likely to show distress but instead may express their memories through play. A person with PTSD is at a higher risk of suicide and intentional self-harm.

Most people who experience traumatic events do not develop PTSD. People who experience interpersonal violence such as rape, other sexual assaults, being kidnapped, stalking, physical abuse by an intimate partner, and incest or other forms of childhood sexual abuse are more likely to develop PTSD than those who experience non-assault based trauma, such as accidents and natural disasters. Those who experience prolonged trauma, such as slavery, concentration camps, or chronic domestic abuse, may develop complex post-traumatic stress disorder (C-PTSD). C-PTSD is similar to PTSD but has a distinct effect on a person's emotional regulation and core identity.

Prevention may be possible when counselling is targeted at those with early symptoms but is not effective when provided to all trauma-exposed individuals whether or not symptoms are present. The main treatments for people with PTSD are counselling (psychotherapy) and medication. Antidepressants of the SSRI or SNRI type are the first-line medications used for PTSD and are moderately beneficial for about half of people. Benefits from medication are less than those seen with counselling. It is not known whether using medications and counselling together has greater benefit than either method separately. Medications, other than some SSRIs or SNRIs, do not have enough evidence to support their use and, in the case of benzodiazepines, may worsen outcomes.

In the United States, about 3.5% of adults have PTSD in a given year, and 9% of people develop it at some point in their life. In much of the rest of the world, rates during a given year are between 0.5% and 1%. Higher rates may occur in regions of armed conflict. It is more common in women than men.

Symptoms of trauma-related mental disorders have been documented since at least the time of the ancient Greeks. A few instances of evidence of post-traumatic illness have been argued to exist from the seventeenth and eighteenth centuries, such as the diary of Samuel Pepys, who described intrusive and distressing symptoms following the 1666 Fire of London. During the world wars, the condition was known under various terms, including 'shell shock', 'war nerves', neurasthenia and 'combat neurosis'. The term "post-traumatic stress disorder" came into use in the 1970s in large part due to the diagnoses of U.S. military veterans of the Vietnam War. It was officially recognized by the American Psychiatric Association in 1980 in the third edition of the Diagnostic and Statistical Manual of Mental Disorders (DSM-III).

Symptoms 

Symptoms of PTSD generally begin within the first three months after the inciting traumatic event, but may not begin until years later. In the typical case, the individual with PTSD persistently avoids either trauma-related thoughts and emotions or discussion of the traumatic event and may even have amnesia of the event. However, the event is commonly relived by the individual through intrusive, recurrent recollections, dissociative episodes of reliving the trauma ("flashbacks"), and nightmares (50 to 70%). While it is common to have symptoms after any traumatic event, these must persist to a sufficient degree (i.e., causing dysfunction in life or clinical levels of distress) for longer than one month after the trauma to be classified as PTSD (clinically significant dysfunction or distress for less than one month after the trauma may be acute stress disorder). Some following a traumatic event experience post-traumatic growth.

Associated medical conditions 
Trauma survivors often develop depression, anxiety disorders, and mood disorders in addition to PTSD.

Substance use disorder, such as alcohol use disorder, commonly co-occur with PTSD. Recovery from post-traumatic stress disorder or other anxiety disorders may be hindered, or the condition worsened, when substance use disorders are comorbid with PTSD. Resolving these problems can bring about improvement in an individual's mental health status and anxiety levels.

PTSD has a strong association with tinnitus, and can even possibly be the tinnitus' cause. 

In children and adolescents, there is a strong association between emotional regulation difficulties (e.g. mood swings, anger outbursts, temper tantrums) and post-traumatic stress symptoms, independent of age, gender, or type of trauma.

Moral injury the feeling of moral distress such as a shame or guilt following a moral transgression is associated with PTSD but is distinguished from it. Moral injury is associated with shame and guilt while PTSD is associated with anxiety and fear.

Risk factors 

Persons considered at risk include combat military personnel, survivors of natural disasters, concentration camp survivors, and survivors of violent crime. Persons employed in occupations that expose them to violence (such as soldiers) or disasters (such as emergency service workers) are also at risk. Other occupations that are at higher risk include police officers, firefighters, ambulance personnel, health care professionals, train drivers, divers, journalists, and sailors, in addition to people who work at banks, post offices or in stores.

Trauma 

PTSD has been associated with a wide range of traumatic events. The risk of developing PTSD after a traumatic event varies by trauma type and is highest following exposure to sexual violence (11.4%), particularly rape (19.0%). Men are more likely to experience a traumatic event (of any type), but women are more likely to experience the kind of high-impact traumatic event that can lead to PTSD, such as interpersonal violence and sexual assault.

Motor vehicle collision survivors, both children and adults, are at an increased risk of PTSD. Globally, about 2.6% of adults are diagnosed with PTSD following a non-life-threatening traffic accident, and a similar proportion of children develop PTSD. Risk of PTSD almost doubles to 4.6% for life-threatening auto accidents. Females were more likely to be diagnosed with PTSD following a road traffic accident, whether the accident occurred during childhood or adulthood.

Post-traumatic stress reactions have been studied in children and adolescents. The rate of PTSD might be lower in children than adults, but in the absence of therapy, symptoms may continue for decades. One estimate suggests that the proportion of children and adolescents having PTSD in a non-wartorn population in a developed country may be 1% compared to 1.5% to 3% of adults. On average, 16% of children exposed to a traumatic event develop PTSD, varying according to type of exposure and gender. Similar to the adult population, risk factors for PTSD in children include: female gender, exposure to disasters (natural or manmade), negative coping behaviours, and/or lacking proper social support systems.

Predictor models have consistently found that childhood trauma, chronic adversity, neurobiological differences, and familial stressors are associated with risk for PTSD after a traumatic event in adulthood. It has been difficult to find consistently aspects of the events that predict, but peritraumatic dissociation has been a fairly consistent predictive indicator of the development of PTSD. Proximity to, duration of, and severity of the trauma make an impact. It has been speculated that interpersonal traumas cause more problems than impersonal ones, but this is controversial. The risk of developing PTSD is increased in individuals who are exposed to physical abuse, physical assault, or kidnapping. Women who experience physical violence are more likely to develop PTSD than men.

Intimate partner violence 

An individual that has been exposed to domestic violence is predisposed to the development of PTSD. There is a strong association between the development of PTSD in mothers that experienced domestic violence during the perinatal period of their pregnancy.

Those who have experienced sexual assault or rape may develop symptoms of PTSD. PTSD symptoms include re-experiencing the assault, avoiding things associated with the assault, numbness, and increased anxiety and an increased startle response. The likelihood of sustained symptoms of PTSD is higher if the rapist confined or restrained the person, if the person being raped believed the rapist would kill them, the person who was raped was very young or very old, and if the rapist was someone they knew. The likelihood of sustained severe symptoms is also higher if people around the survivor ignore (or are ignorant of) the rape or blame the rape survivor.

War-related trauma 

Military service is a risk factor for developing PTSD. Around 78% of people exposed to combat do not develop PTSD; in about 25% of military personnel who develop PTSD, its appearance is delayed.

Refugees are also at an increased risk for PTSD due to their exposure to war, hardships, and traumatic events. The rates for PTSD within refugee populations range from 4% to 86%. While the stresses of war affect everyone involved, displaced persons have been shown to be more so than others.

Challenges related to the overall psychosocial well-being of refugees are complex and individually nuanced. Refugees have reduced levels of well-being and a high rates of mental distress due to past and ongoing trauma. Groups that are particularly affected and whose needs often remain unmet are women, older people and unaccompanied minors. Post-traumatic stress and depression in refugee populations also tend to affect their educational success.

Unexpected death of a loved one 
Sudden, unexpected death of a loved one is the most common traumatic event type reported in cross-national studies. However, the majority of people who experience this type of event will not develop PTSD. An analysis from the WHO World Mental Health Surveys found a 5.2% risk of developing PTSD after learning of the unexpected death of a loved one. Because of the high prevalence of this type of traumatic event, unexpected death of a loved one accounts for approximately 20% of PTSD cases worldwide.

Life-threatening illness 
Medical conditions associated with an increased risk of PTSD include cancer, heart attack, and stroke. 22% of cancer survivors present with lifelong PTSD like symptoms. Intensive-care unit (ICU) hospitalization is also a risk factor for PTSD. Some women experience PTSD from their experiences related to breast cancer and mastectomy. Loved ones of those who experience life-threatening illnesses are also at risk for developing PTSD, such as parents of child with chronic illnesses.

Pregnancy-related trauma 

Women who experience miscarriage are at risk of PTSD. Those who experience subsequent miscarriages have an increased risk of PTSD compared to those experiencing only one. PTSD can also occur after childbirth and the risk increases if a woman has experienced trauma prior to the pregnancy. Prevalence of PTSD following normal childbirth (that is, excluding stillbirth or major complications) is estimated to be between 2.8 and 5.6% at six weeks postpartum, with rates dropping to 1.5% at six months postpartum. Symptoms of PTSD are common following childbirth, with prevalence of 24–30.1% at six weeks, dropping to 13.6% at six months. Emergency childbirth is also associated with PTSD.

Genetics 

There is evidence that susceptibility to PTSD is hereditary. Approximately 30% of the variance in PTSD is caused from genetics alone. For twin pairs exposed to combat in Vietnam, having a monozygotic (identical) twin with PTSD was associated with an increased risk of the co-twin's having PTSD compared to twins that were dizygotic (non-identical twins). Women with a smaller hippocampus might be more likely to develop PTSD following a traumatic event based on preliminary findings. Research has also found that PTSD shares many genetic influences common to other psychiatric disorders. Panic and generalized anxiety disorders and PTSD share 60% of the same genetic variance. Alcohol, nicotine, and drug dependence share greater than 40% genetic similarities.

Several biological indicators have been identified that are related to later PTSD development. Heightened startle responses and, with only preliminary results, a smaller hippocampal volume have been identified as possible biomarkers for heightened risk of developing PTSD. Additionally, one study found that soldiers whose leukocytes had greater numbers of glucocorticoid receptors were more prone to developing PTSD after experiencing trauma.

Pathophysiology

Neuroendocrinology 
PTSD symptoms may result when a traumatic event causes an over-reactive adrenaline response, which creates deep neurological patterns in the brain. These patterns can persist long after the event that triggered the fear, making an individual hyper-responsive to future fearful situations. During traumatic experiences, the high levels of stress hormones secreted suppress hypothalamic activity that may be a major factor toward the development of PTSD.

PTSD causes biochemical changes in the brain and body, that differ from other psychiatric disorders such as major depression. Individuals diagnosed with PTSD respond more strongly to a dexamethasone suppression test than individuals diagnosed with clinical depression.

Most people with PTSD show a low secretion of cortisol and high secretion of catecholamines in urine, with a norepinephrine/cortisol ratio consequently higher than comparable non-diagnosed individuals. This is in contrast to the normative fight-or-flight response, in which both catecholamine and cortisol levels are elevated after exposure to a stressor.

Brain catecholamine levels are high, and corticotropin-releasing factor (CRF) concentrations are high. Together, these findings suggest abnormality in the hypothalamic-pituitary-adrenal (HPA) axis.

The maintenance of fear has been shown to include the HPA axis, the locus coeruleus-noradrenergic systems, and the connections between the limbic system and frontal cortex. The HPA axis that coordinates the hormonal response to stress, which activates the LC-noradrenergic system, is implicated in the over-consolidation of memories that occurs in the aftermath of trauma. This over-consolidation increases the likelihood of one's developing PTSD. The amygdala is responsible for threat detection and the conditioned and unconditioned fear responses that are carried out as a response to a threat.

The HPA axis is responsible for coordinating the hormonal response to stress. Given the strong cortisol suppression to dexamethasone in PTSD, HPA axis abnormalities are likely predicated on strong negative feedback inhibition of cortisol, itself likely due to an increased sensitivity of glucocorticoid receptors.

PTSD has been hypothesized to be a maladaptive learning pathway to fear response through a hypersensitive, hyperreactive, and hyperresponsive HPA axis.

Low cortisol levels may predispose individuals to PTSD: Following war trauma, Swedish soldiers serving in Bosnia and Herzegovina with low pre-service salivary cortisol levels had a higher risk of reacting with PTSD symptoms, following war trauma, than soldiers with normal pre-service levels. Because cortisol is normally important in restoring homeostasis after the stress response, it is thought that trauma survivors with low cortisol experience a poorly contained—that is, longer and more distressing—response, setting the stage for PTSD.

It is thought that the locus coeruleus-noradrenergic system mediates the over-consolidation of fear memory. High levels of cortisol reduce noradrenergic activity, and because people with PTSD tend to have reduced levels of cortisol, it has been proposed that individuals with PTSD cannot regulate the increased noradrenergic response to traumatic stress. Intrusive memories and conditioned fear responses are thought to be a result of the response to associated triggers. Neuropeptide Y (NPY) has been reported to reduce the release of norepinephrine and has been demonstrated to have anxiolytic properties in animal models. Studies have shown people with PTSD demonstrate reduced levels of NPY, possibly indicating their increased anxiety levels.

Other studies indicate that people with PTSD have chronically low levels of serotonin, which contributes to the commonly associated behavioral symptoms such as anxiety, ruminations, irritability, aggression, suicidality, and impulsivity. Serotonin also contributes to the stabilization of glucocorticoid production.

Dopamine levels in a person with PTSD can contribute to symptoms: low levels can contribute to anhedonia, apathy, impaired attention, and motor deficits; high levels can contribute to psychosis, agitation, and restlessness.

Several studies described elevated concentrations of the thyroid hormone triiodothyronine in PTSD. This kind of type 2 allostatic adaptation may contribute to increased sensitivity to catecholamines and other stress mediators.

Hyperresponsiveness in the norepinephrine system can also be caused by continued exposure to high stress. Overactivation of norepinephrine receptors in the prefrontal cortex can be connected to the flashbacks and nightmares frequently experienced by those with PTSD. A decrease in other norepinephrine functions (awareness of the current environment) prevents the memory mechanisms in the brain from processing the experience, and emotions the person is experiencing during a flashback are not associated with the current environment.

There is considerable controversy within the medical community regarding the neurobiology of PTSD. A 2012 review showed no clear relationship between cortisol levels and PTSD. The majority of reports indicate people with PTSD have elevated levels of corticotropin-releasing hormone, lower basal cortisol levels, and enhanced negative feedback suppression of the HPA axis by dexamethasone.

Neuroanatomy 

A meta-analysis of structural MRI studies found an association with reduced total brain volume, intracranial volume, and volumes of the hippocampus, insula cortex, and anterior cingulate. Much of this research stems from PTSD in those exposed to the Vietnam War.

People with PTSD have decreased brain activity in the dorsal and rostral anterior cingulate cortices and the ventromedial prefrontal cortex, areas linked to the experience and regulation of emotion.

The amygdala is strongly involved in forming emotional memories, especially fear-related memories. During high stress, the hippocampus, which is associated with placing memories in the correct context of space and time and memory recall, is suppressed. According to one theory this suppression may be the cause of the flashbacks that can affect people with PTSD. When someone with PTSD undergoes stimuli similar to the traumatic event, the body perceives the event as occurring again because the memory was never properly recorded in the person's memory.

The amygdalocentric model of PTSD proposes that the amygdala is very much aroused and insufficiently controlled by the medial prefrontal cortex and the hippocampus, in particular during extinction. This is consistent with an interpretation of PTSD as a syndrome of deficient extinction ability.

The basolateral nucleus (BLA) of the amygdala is responsible for the comparison and development of associations between unconditioned and conditioned responses to stimuli, which results in the fear conditioning present in PTSD. The BLA activates the central nucleus (CeA) of the amygdala, which elaborates the fear response, (including behavioral response to threat and elevated startle response). Descending inhibitory inputs from the medial prefrontal cortex (mPFC) regulate the transmission from the BLA to the CeA, which is hypothesized to play a role in the extinction of conditioned fear responses. While as a whole, amygdala hyperactivity is reported by meta analysis of functional neuroimaging in PTSD, there is a large degree of heterogeniety, more so than in social anxiety disorder or phobic disorder. Comparing dorsal (roughly the CeA) and ventral(roughly the BLA) clusters, hyperactivity is more robust in the ventral cluster, while hypoactivity is evident in the dorsal cluster. The distinction may explain the blunted emotions in PTSD (via desensitization in the CeA) as well as the fear related component.

In a 2007 study Vietnam War combat veterans with PTSD showed a 20% reduction in the volume of their hippocampus compared with veterans who did not have such symptoms. This finding was not replicated in chronic PTSD patients traumatized at an air show plane crash in 1988 (Ramstein, Germany).

Evidence suggests that endogenous cannabinoid levels are reduced in PTSD, particularly anandamide, and that cannabinoid receptors (CB1) are increased in order to compensate. There appears to be a link between increased CB1 receptor availability in the amygdala and abnormal threat processing and hyperarousal, but not dysphoria, in trauma survivors.

A 2020 study found no evidence for conclusions from prior research that suggested low IQ is a risk factor for developing PTSD.

Diagnosis 
PTSD can be difficult to diagnose, because of:
 the subjective nature of most of the diagnostic criteria (although this is true for many mental disorders); 
 the potential for over-reporting, e.g., while seeking disability benefits, or when PTSD could be a mitigating factor at criminal sentencing
 the potential for under-reporting, e.g., stigma, pride, fear that a PTSD diagnosis might preclude certain employment opportunities;
 symptom overlap with other mental disorders such as obsessive compulsive disorder and generalized anxiety disorder;
 association with other mental disorders such as major depressive disorder and generalized anxiety disorder;
 substance use disorders, which often produce some of the same signs and symptoms as PTSD; and 
 substance use disorders can increase vulnerability to PTSD or exacerbate PTSD symptoms or both; and
 PTSD increases the risk for developing substance use disorders.
the differential expression of symptoms culturally (specifically with respect to avoidance and numbing symptoms, distressing dreams, and somatic symptoms)

Screening 
There are a number of PTSD screening instruments for adults, such as the PTSD Checklist for DSM-5 (PCL-5) and the Primary Care PTSD Screen for DSM-5 (PC-PTSD-5).

There are also several screening and assessment instruments for use with children and adolescents. These include the Child PTSD Symptom Scale (CPSS), Child Trauma Screening Questionnaire, and UCLA Post-traumatic Stress Disorder Reaction Index for DSM-IV.

In addition, there are also screening and assessment instruments for caregivers of very young children (six years of age and younger). These include the Young Child PTSD Screen, the Young Child PTSD Checklist, and the Diagnostic Infant and Preschool Assessment.

Assessment 
Evidence-based assessment principles, including a multimethod assessment approach, form the foundation of PTSD assessment. Those who conduct assessments for PTSD may use various clinician-administered interviews and instruments to provide an official PTSD diagnosis. Some commonly used, reliable, and valid assessment instruments for PTSD diagnosis, in accordance with the DSM-5, include the Clinician-Administered PTSD Scale for the DSM-5 (CAPS-5), PTSD Symptom Scale Interview (PSS-I-5), and Structured Clinical Interview for DSM-5 - PTSD Module (SCID-5 PTSD Module).

Diagnostic and statistical manual 
PTSD was classified as an anxiety disorder in the DSM-IV, but has since been reclassified as a "trauma- and stressor-related disorder" in the DSM-5. The DSM-5 diagnostic criteria for PTSD include four symptom clusters: re-experiencing, avoidance, negative alterations in cognition/mood, and alterations in arousal and reactivity.

International classification of diseases 
The International Classification of Diseases and Related Health Problems 10 (ICD-10) classifies PTSD under "Reaction to severe stress, and adjustment disorders." The ICD-10 criteria for PTSD include re-experiencing, avoidance, and either increased reactivity or inability to recall certain details related to the event.

The ICD-11 diagnostic description for PTSD contains three components or symptom groups (1) re-experiencing, (2) avoidance, and (3) heightened sense of threat. ICD-11 no longer includes verbal thoughts about the traumatic event as a symptom. There is a predicted lower rate of diagnosed PTSD using ICD-11 compared to ICD10 or DSM-5. ICD-11 also proposes identifying a distinct group with complex post-traumatic stress disorder (CPTSD), who have more often experienced several or sustained traumas and have greater functional impairment than those with PTSD.

Differential diagnosis 
A diagnosis of PTSD requires that the person has been exposed to an extreme stressor. Any stressor can result in a diagnosis of adjustment disorder and it is an appropriate diagnosis for a stressor and a symptom pattern that does not meet the criteria for PTSD.

The symptom pattern for acute stress disorder must occur and be resolved within four weeks of the trauma. If it lasts longer, and the symptom pattern fits that characteristic of PTSD, the diagnosis may be changed.

Obsessive compulsive disorder may be diagnosed for intrusive thoughts that are recurring but not related to a specific traumatic event.

In extreme cases of prolonged, repeated traumatization where there is no viable chance of escape, survivors may develop complex post-traumatic stress disorder. This occurs as a result of layers of trauma rather than a single traumatic event, and includes additional symptomatology, such as the loss of a coherent sense of self.

Prevention 

Modest benefits have been seen from early access to cognitive behavioral therapy. Critical incident stress management has been suggested as a means of preventing PTSD, but subsequent studies suggest the likelihood of its producing negative outcomes. A 2019 Cochrane review did not find any evidence to support the use of an intervention offered to everyone", and that "multiple session interventions may result in worse outcome than no intervention for some individuals." The World Health Organization recommends against the use of benzodiazepines and antidepressants in for acute stress (symptoms lasting less than one month). Some evidence supports the use of hydrocortisone for prevention in adults, although there is limited or no evidence supporting propranolol, escitalopram, temazepam, or gabapentin.

Psychological debriefing 

Trauma-exposed individuals often receive treatment called psychological debriefing in an effort to prevent PTSD, which consists of interviews that are meant to allow individuals to directly confront the event and share their feelings with the counselor and to help structure their memories of the event. However, several meta-analyses find that psychological debriefing is unhelpful and is potentially harmful. This is true for both single-session debriefing and multiple session interventions. As of 2017 the American Psychological Association assessed psychological debriefing as No Research Support/Treatment is Potentially Harmful.

Early intervention 
Trauma focused intervention delivered within days or weeks of the potentially traumatic event has been found to decrease PTSD symptoms. Similar to psychological debriefing, the goal of early intervention is to lessen the intensity and frequency of stress symptoms with the aim of preventing new-onset or relapsed mental disorders and further distress later in the healing process.

Risk-targeted interventions 

Risk-targeted interventions are those that attempt to mitigate specific formative information or events. It can target modeling normal behaviors, instruction on a task, or giving information on the event.

Management 

Reviews of studies have found that combination therapy (psychological and pharmacotherapy) is no more effective than psychological therapy alone.

Counselling 
The approaches with the strongest evidence include behavioral and cognitive-behavioral therapies such as prolonged exposure therapy, cognitive processing therapy, and eye movement desensitization and reprocessing (EMDR). There is some evidence for brief eclectic psychotherapy (BEP), narrative exposure therapy (NET), and written exposure therapy.

A 2019 Cochrane review evaluated couples and family therapies compared to no care and individual and group therapies for the treatment of PTSD. There were too few studies on couples therapies to determine if substantive benefits were derived but preliminary RCTs suggested that couples therapies may be beneficial for reducing PTSD symptoms.

A meta-analytic comparison of EMDR and cognitive behavioral therapy (CBT) found both protocols indistinguishable in terms of effectiveness in treating PTSD; however, "the contribution of the eye movement component in EMDR to treatment outcome" is unclear. A meta-analysis in children and adolescents also found that EMDR was as efficacious as CBT.

Children with PTSD are far more likely to pursue treatment at school (because of its proximity and ease) than at a free clinic.

Cognitive behavioral therapy 

CBT seeks to change the way a person feels and acts by changing the patterns of thinking or behavior, or both, responsible for negative emotions. Results from a 2018 systematic review found high strength of evidence that supports CBT-exposure therapy efficacious for a reduction in PTSD and depression symptoms, as well as the loss of PTSD diagnosis. CBT has been proven to be an effective treatment for PTSD and is currently considered the standard of care for PTSD by the United States Department of Defense. In CBT, individuals learn to identify thoughts that make them feel afraid or upset and replace them with less distressing thoughts. The goal is to understand how certain thoughts about events cause PTSD-related stress. A study assessing an online version of CBT for people with mild-to-moderate PTSD found that the online approach was as effective as, and cheaper than, the same therapy given face-to-face. A 2021 Cochrane review assessed the provision of CBT in an Internet-based format found similar beneficial effects for Internet-based therapy as in face-to-face. However, the quality of the evidence was low due to the small number of trials reviewed.

Exposure therapy is a type of cognitive behavioral therapy that involves assisting trauma survivors to re-experience distressing trauma-related memories and reminders in order to facilitate habituation and successful emotional processing of the trauma memory. Most exposure therapy programs include both imaginal confrontation with the traumatic memories and real-life exposure to trauma reminders; this therapy modality is well supported by clinical evidence. The success of exposure-based therapies has raised the question of whether exposure is a necessary ingredient in the treatment of PTSD. Some organizations have endorsed the need for exposure. The U.S. Department of Veterans Affairs has been actively training mental health treatment staff in prolonged exposure therapy and Cognitive Processing Therapy in an effort to better treat U.S. veterans with PTSD.

Recent research on contextually based third-generation behavior therapies suggests that they may produce results comparable to some of the better validated therapies. Many of these therapy methods have a significant element of exposure and have demonstrated success in treating the primary problems of PTSD and co-occurring depressive symptoms.

Eye movement desensitization and reprocessing 

Eye movement desensitization and reprocessing (EMDR) is a form of psychotherapy developed and studied by Francine Shapiro. She had noticed that, when she was thinking about disturbing memories herself, her eyes were moving rapidly. When she brought her eye movements under control while thinking, the thoughts were less distressing.

In 2002, Shapiro and Maxfield published a theory of why this might work, called adaptive information processing. This theory proposes that eye movement can be used to facilitate emotional processing of memories, changing the person's memory to attend to more adaptive information. The therapist initiates voluntary rapid eye movements while the person focuses on memories, feelings or thoughts about a particular trauma. The therapists uses hand movements to get the person to move their eyes backward and forward, but hand-tapping or tones can also be used. EMDR closely resembles cognitive behavior therapy as it combines exposure (re-visiting the traumatic event), working on cognitive processes and relaxation/self-monitoring. However, exposure by way of being asked to think about the experience rather than talk about it has been highlighted as one of the more important distinguishing elements of EMDR.

There have been several small controlled trials of four to eight weeks of EMDR in adults as well as children and adolescents. There is moderate strength of evidence to support the efficacy of EMDR "for reduction in PTSD symptoms, loss of diagnosis, and reduction in depressive symptoms" according to a 2018 systematic review update. EMDR reduced PTSD symptoms enough in the short term that one in two adults no longer met the criteria for PTSD, but the number of people involved in these trials was small and thus results should be interpreted with caution pending further research. There was not enough evidence to know whether or not EMDR could eliminate PTSD in adults. In children and adolescents, a recent meta-analysis of randomized controlled trials using MetaNSUE to avoid biases related to missing information found that EMDR was at least as efficacious as CBT, and superior to waitlist or placebo. There was some evidence that EMDR might prevent depression. There were no studies comparing EMDR to other psychological treatments or to medication. Adverse effects were largely unstudied. The benefits were greater for women with a history of sexual assault compared with people who had experienced other types of traumatizing events (such as accidents, physical assaults and war). There is a small amount of evidence that EMDR may improve re-experiencing symptoms in children and adolescents, but EMDR has not been shown to improve other PTSD symptoms, anxiety, or depression.

The eye movement component of the therapy may not be critical for benefit. As there has been no major, high quality randomized trial of EMDR with eye movements versus EMDR without eye movements, the controversy over effectiveness is likely to continue. Authors of a meta-analysis published in 2013 stated, "We found that people treated with eye movement therapy had greater improvement in their symptoms of post-traumatic stress disorder than people given therapy without eye movements.... Secondly we found that in laboratory studies the evidence concludes that thinking of upsetting memories and simultaneously doing a task that facilitates eye movements reduces the vividness and distress associated with the upsetting memories."

Interpersonal psychotherapy 
Other approaches, in particular involving social supports, may also be important. An open trial of interpersonal psychotherapy reported high rates of remission from PTSD symptoms without using exposure. A current, NIMH-funded trial in New York City is now (and into 2013) comparing interpersonal psychotherapy, prolonged exposure therapy, and relaxation therapy.

Medication 
While many medications do not have enough evidence to support their use, four (sertraline, fluoxetine, paroxetine, and venlafaxine) have been shown to have a small to modest benefit over placebo. With many medications, residual PTSD symptoms following treatment is the rule rather than the exception.

Antidepressants 
Selective serotonin reuptake inhibitors (SSRIs) and serotonin-norepinephrine reuptake inhibitors (SNRIs) may have some benefit for PTSD symptoms. Tricyclic antidepressants are equally effective but are less well tolerated. Evidence provides support for a small or modest improvement with sertraline, fluoxetine, paroxetine, and venlafaxine. Thus, these four medications are considered to be first-line medications for PTSD.

Benzodiazepines 
Benzodiazepines are not recommended for the treatment of PTSD due to a lack of evidence of benefit and risk of worsening PTSD symptoms. Some authors believe that the use of benzodiazepines is contraindicated for acute stress, as this group of drugs can cause dissociation. Nevertheless, some use benzodiazepines with caution for short-term anxiety and insomnia. While benzodiazepines can alleviate acute anxiety, there is no consistent evidence that they can stop the development of PTSD and may actually increase the risk of developing PTSD 2–5 times. Additionally, benzodiazepines may reduce the effectiveness of psychotherapeutic interventions, and there is some evidence that benzodiazepines may actually contribute to the development and chronification of PTSD. For those who already have PTSD, benzodiazepines may worsen and prolong the course of illness, by worsening psychotherapy outcomes, and causing or exacerbating aggression, depression (including suicidality), and substance use. Drawbacks include the risk of developing a benzodiazepine dependence, tolerance (i.e., short-term benefits wearing off with time), and withdrawal syndrome; additionally, individuals with PTSD (even those without a history of alcohol or drug misuse) are at an increased risk of abusing benzodiazepines. Due to a number of other treatments with greater efficacy for PTSD and less risks (e.g., prolonged exposure, cognitive processing therapy, eye movement desensitization and reprocessing, cognitive restructuring therapy, trauma-focused cognitive behavioral therapy, brief eclectic psychotherapy, narrative therapy, stress inoculation training, serotonergic antidepressants, adrenergic inhibitors, antipsychotics, and even anticonvulsants), benzodiazepines should be considered relatively contraindicated until all other treatment options are exhausted. For those who argue that benzodiazepines should be used sooner in the most severe cases, the adverse risk of disinhibition (associated with suicidality, aggression and crimes) and clinical risks of delaying or inhibiting definitive efficacious treatments, make other alternative treatments preferable (e.g., inpatient, residential, partial hospitalization, intensive outpatient, dialectic behavior therapy; and other fast-acting sedating medications such as trazodone, mirtazapine, amitripytline, doxepin, prazosin, propranolol, guanfacine, clonidine, quetiapine, olanzapine, valproate, gabapentin).

Prazosin 
Prazosin, an alpha-1 adrenergic antagonist, has been used in veterans with PTSD to reduce nightmares. Studies show variability in the symptom improvement, appropriate dosages, and efficacy in this population.

Glucocorticoids 
Glucocorticoids may be useful for short-term therapy to protect against neurodegeneration caused by the extended stress response that characterizes PTSD, but long-term use may actually promote neurodegeneration.

Cannabinoids 
Cannabis is not recommended as a treatment for PTSD because scientific evidence does not currently exist demonstrating treatment efficacy for cannabinoids. However, use of cannabis or derived products is widespread among U.S. veterans with PTSD.

The cannabinoid nabilone is sometimes used for nightmares in PTSD. Although some short-term benefit was shown, adverse effects are common and it has not been adequately studied to determine efficacy. An increasing number of states permit and have legalized the use of medical cannabis for the treatment of PTSD.

Other

Exercise, sport and physical activity 
Physical activity can influence people's psychological and physical health. The U.S. National Center for PTSD recommends moderate exercise as a way to distract from disturbing emotions, build self-esteem and increase feelings of being in control again. They recommend a discussion with a doctor before starting an exercise program.

Play therapy for children 
Play is thought to help children link their inner thoughts with their outer world, connecting real experiences with abstract thought. Repetitive play can also be one way a child relives traumatic events, and that can be a symptom of trauma in a child or young person. Although it is commonly used, there have not been enough studies comparing outcomes in groups of children receiving and not receiving play therapy, so the effects of play therapy are not yet understood.

Military programs 
Many veterans of the wars in Iraq and Afghanistan have faced significant physical, emotional, and relational disruptions. In response, the United States Marine Corps has instituted programs to assist them in re-adjusting to civilian life, especially in their relationships with spouses and loved ones, to help them communicate better and understand what the other has gone through. Walter Reed Army Institute of Research (WRAIR) developed the Battlemind program to assist service members avoid or ameliorate PTSD and related problems. Wounded Warrior Project partnered with the US Department of Veterans Affairs to create Warrior Care Network, a national health system of PTSD treatment centers.

Nightmares 
In 2020, the United States Food and Drug Administration granted marketing approval for an Apple Watch app call NightWare. The app aims to improve sleep for people suffering from PTSD-related nightmares, by vibrating when it detects a nightmare in progress based on monitoring heart rate and body movement.

Epidemiology 

There is debate over the rates of PTSD found in populations, but, despite changes in diagnosis and the criteria used to define PTSD between 1997 and 2013, epidemiological rates have not changed significantly. Most of the current reliable data regarding the epidemiology of PTSD is based on DSM-IV criteria, as the DSM-5 was not introduced until 2013.

The United Nations' World Health Organization publishes estimates of PTSD impact for each of its member states; the latest data available are for 2004. Considering only the 25 most populated countries ranked by overall age-standardized Disability-Adjusted Life Year (DALY) rate, the top half of the ranked list is dominated by Asian/Pacific countries, the US, and Egypt. Ranking the countries by the male-only or female-only rates produces much the same result, but with less meaningfulness, as the score range in the single-sex rankings is much-reduced (4 for women, 3 for men, as compared with 14 for the overall score range), suggesting that the differences between female and male rates, within each country, is what drives the distinctions between the countries.

As of 2017, the cross-national lifetime prevalence of PTSD was 3.9%, based on a survey were 5.6% had been exposed to trauma. The primary factor impacting treatment-seeking behavior, which can help to mitigate PTSD development after trauma was income, while being younger, female, and having less social status (less education, lower individual income, and being unemployed) were all factors associated with less treatment-seeking behaviour.

United States 
The National Comorbidity Survey Replication has estimated that the lifetime prevalence of PTSD among adult Americans is 6.8%, with women (9.7%) more than twice as likely as men (3.6%) to have PTSD at some point in their lives. More than 60% of men and more than 60% of women experience at least one traumatic event in their life. The most frequently reported traumatic events by men are rape, combat, and childhood neglect or physical abuse. Women most frequently report instances of rape, sexual molestation, physical attack, being threatened with a weapon and childhood physical abuse. 88% of men and 79% of women with lifetime PTSD have at least one comorbid psychiatric disorder. Major depressive disorder, 48% of men and 49% of women, and lifetime alcohol use disorder or dependence, 51.9% of men and 27.9% of women, are the most common comorbid disorders.

Military combat 
The United States Department of Veterans Affairs estimates that 830,000 Vietnam War veterans had symptoms of PTSD. The National Vietnam Veterans' Readjustment Study (NVVRS) found 15% of male and 9% of female Vietnam veterans had PTSD at the time of the study. Life-time prevalence of PTSD was 31% for males and 27% for females. In a reanalysis of the NVVRS data, along with analysis of the data from the Matsunaga Vietnam Veterans Project, Schnurr, Lunney, Sengupta, and Waelde found that, contrary to the initial analysis of the NVVRS data, a large majority of Vietnam veterans had PTSD symptoms (but not the disorder itself). Four out of five reported recent symptoms when interviewed 20–25 years after Vietnam.

A 2011 study from Georgia State University and San Diego State University found that rates of PTSD diagnosis increased significantly when troops were stationed in combat zones, had tours of longer than a year, experienced combat, or were injured. Military personnel serving in combat zones were 12.1 percentage points more likely to receive a PTSD diagnosis than their active-duty counterparts in non-combat zones. Those serving more than 12 months in a combat zone were 14.3 percentage points more likely to be diagnosed with PTSD than those having served less than one year. Experiencing an enemy firefight was associated with an 18.3 percentage point increase in the probability of PTSD, while being wounded or injured in combat was associated with a 23.9 percentage point increase in the likelihood of a PTSD diagnosis. For the 2.16 million U.S. troops deployed in combat zones between 2001 and 2010, the total estimated two-year costs of treatment for combat-related PTSD are between $1.54 billion and $2.69 billion.

As of 2013, rates of PTSD have been estimated at up to 20% for veterans returning from Iraq and Afghanistan. As of 2013 13% of veterans returning from Iraq were unemployed.

Man-made disasters 
The September 11 attacks took the lives of nearly 3,000 people, leaving 6,000 injured. First responders (police, firefighters, and emergency medical technicians), sanitation workers, and volunteers were all involved in the recovery efforts. The prevalence of probable PTSD in these highly exposed populations was estimated across several studies using in-person, telephone, and online interviews and questionnaires. Overall prevalence of PTSD was highest immediately following the attacks and decreased over time. However, disparities were found among the different types of recovery workers. The rate of probable PTSD for first responders was lowest directly after the attacks and increased from ranges of 4.8-7.8% to 7.4-16.5% between the 5-6 year follow-up and a later assessment. When comparing traditional responders to non-traditional responders (volunteers), the probable PTSD prevalence 2.5 years after the initial visit was greater in volunteers with estimates of 11.7% and 17.2% respectively. Volunteer participation in tasks atypical to the defined occupational role was a significant risk factor for PTSD. Other risk factors included exposure intensity, earlier start date, duration of time spent on site, and constant, negative reminders of the trauma. Additional research has been performed to understand the social consequences of the September 11 attacks. Alcohol consumption was assessed in a cohort of World Trade Center workers using the cut-annoyed-guilty-eye (CAGE) questionnaire for alcohol use disorder. Almost 50% of World Trade Center workers who self-identified as alcohol users reported drinking more during the rescue efforts. Nearly a quarter of these individuals reported drinking more following the recovery. If determined to have probable PTSD status, the risk of developing an alcohol problem was double compared to those without psychological morbidity. Social disability was also studied in this cohort as a social consequence of the September 11 attacks. Defined by the disruption of family, work, and social life, the risk of developing social disability increased 17-fold when categorized as having probable PTSD.

Anthropology 

Cultural and medical anthropologists have questioned the validity of applying the diagnostic criteria of PTSD cross-culturally.

Trauma (and resulting PTSD) is often experienced through the outermost limits of suffering, pain and fear. The images and experiences relived through PTSD often defy easy description through language. Therefore, the translation of these experiences from one language to another is problematic, and the primarily Euro-American research on trauma is necessarily limited. The Sapir-Whorf hypothesis suggests that people perceive the world differently according to the language they speak: language and the world it exists within reflect back on the perceptions of the speaker. For example, ethnopsychology studies in Nepal have found that cultural idioms and concepts related to trauma often don't translate to western terminologies: piDaa is a term that may align to trauma/suffering, but also people who suffer from piDaa are considered paagal (mad) and are subject to negative social stigma, indicating the need for culturally appropriate and carefully tailored support interventions. More generally, different cultures remember traumatic past experiences within different linguistic and cultural paradigms. As such, cultural and medical anthropologists have questioned the validity of applying the diagnostic criteria of PTSD cross-culturally, as defined in the Diagnostic and Statistical Manual of Mental Disorders (DSM-III), and constructed through the Euro-American paradigm of psychology.

There remains a dearth of studies into the conceptual frameworks that surround trauma in non-Western cultures. There is little evidence to suggest therapeutic benefit in synthesizing local idioms of distress into a culturally constructed disorder of the post-Vietnam era, a practice anthropologist believe contributes to category fallacy. For many cultures there is no single linguistic corollary to PTSD, psychological trauma being a multi-faceted concept with corresponding variances of expression. Designating the effects of trauma as an affliction of the spirit is common in many non-Western cultures where idioms such as "soul loss" and "weak heart" indicate a preference to confer suffering to a spirit-body or heart-body diametric. These idioms reflect the emphasis that collectivist cultures place on healing trauma through familial, cultural and religious activities while avoiding the stigma that accompanies a mind-body approach. Prescribing PTSD diagnostics within these communities is ineffective and often detrimental. For trauma that extends beyond the individual such as the effects of war, anthropologists believe applying the term "social suffering" or "cultural bereavement" to be more beneficial.

Every facet of society is affected by conflict; the prolonged exposure to mass violence can lead to a 'continuous suffering' among civilians, soldiers, and bordering countries. Entered into the DSM in 1980, clinicians and psychiatrists based the diagnostic criteria for PTSD around American veterans of the Vietnam war. Though the DSM gets reviewed and updated regularly, it is unable to fully encompass the disorder due to its Americanization (or Westernization). That is, what may be considered characteristics of PTSD in western society, may not directly translate across to other cultures around the world. Displaced people of the African country Burundi experienced symptoms of depression and anxiety, though few symptoms specific to PTSD were noted. In a similar review, Sudanese refugees relocated in Uganda were 'concerned with material [effects]' (lack of food, shelter, and healthcare), rather than psychological distress. In this case, many refugees didn't present symptoms at all, with a minor few developing anxiety and depression. War-related stresses and traumas will be ingrained in the individual, however they will be affected differently from culture to culture, and the "clear-cut" rubric for diagnosing PTSD doesn't allow for culturally contextual reactions to take place.

Veterans

United States 
 
The United States provides a range of benefits for veterans that the VA has determined have PTSD, which developed during, or as a result of, their military service. These benefits may include tax-free cash payments, free or low-cost mental health treatment and other healthcare, vocational rehabilitation services, employment assistance, and independent living support.

United Kingdom 
In the UK, there are various charities and service organisations dedicated to aiding veterans in readjusting to civilian life. The Royal British Legion and the more recently established Help for Heroes are two of Britain's more high-profile veterans' organisations which have actively advocated for veterans over the years. There has been some controversy that the NHS has not done enough in tackling mental health issues and is instead "dumping" veterans on charities such as Combat Stress.

Canada 
Veterans Affairs Canada offers a new program that includes rehabilitation, financial benefits, job placement, health benefits program, disability awards, peer support and family support.

History 
Aspects of PTSD in soldiers of ancient Assyria have been identified using written sources from 1300 to 600 BCE. These Assyrian soldiers would undergo a three-year rotation of combat before being allowed to return home, and were reported to have faced immense challenges in reconciling their past actions in war with their civilian lives. 

Connections between the actions of Viking berserkers and the hyperarousal of post-traumatic stress disorder have also been drawn.

Psychiatrist Jonathan Shay has proposed that Lady Percy's soliloquy in the William Shakespeare play Henry IV, Part 1 (act 2, scene 3, lines 40–62), written around 1597, represents an unusually accurate description of the symptom constellation of PTSD.

A study based on personal letters from soldiers of the 18th-century Prussian Army concludes that combatants may have had PTSD. 

Many historical war-time diagnoses such as railway spine, stress syndrome, nostalgia, soldier's heart, shell shock, battle fatigue, combat stress reaction, and traumatic war neurosis are now associated with PTSD. 

The correlations between combat and PTSD are undeniable; according to Stéphane Audoin-Rouzeau and Annette Becker, "One-tenth of mobilized American men were hospitalized for mental disturbances between 1942 and 1945, and, after thirty-five days of uninterrupted combat, 98% of them manifested psychiatric disturbances in varying degrees." 

The DSM-I (1952) includes a diagnosis of "gross stress reaction", which has similarities to the modern definition and understanding of PTSD. Gross stress reaction is defined as a normal personality using established patterns of reaction to deal with overwhelming fear as a response to conditions of great stress. The diagnosis includes language which relates the condition to combat as well as to "civilian catastrophe". 

The addition of the term to the DSM-III was greatly influenced by the experiences and conditions of U.S. military veterans of the Vietnam War. In fact, much of the available published research regarding PTSD is based on studies done on veterans of the war in Vietnam. 

Because of the initial overt focus on PTSD as a combat related disorder when it was first fleshed out in the years following the war in Vietnam, in 1975 Ann Wolbert Burgess and Lynda Lytle Holmstrom defined rape trauma syndrome (RTS) in order to draw attention to the striking similarities between the experiences of soldiers returning from war and of rape victims. This paved the way for a more comprehensive understanding of causes of PTSD.

Early in 1978, the diagnosis term "post-traumatic stress disorder" was first recommended in a working group finding presented to the Committee of Reactive Disorders. 

A USAF study carried out in 1979 focused on individuals (civilian and military) who had worked to recover or identify the remains of those who died in Jonestown. The bodies had been dead for several days, and a third of them had been children. The study used the term "dysphoria" to describe PTSD-like symptoms.

After PTSD became an official American psychiatric diagnosis with the publication of DSM-III (1980), the number of personal injury lawsuits (tort claims) asserting the plaintiff had PTSD increased rapidly. However, triers of fact (judges and juries) often regarded the PTSD diagnostic criteria as imprecise, a view shared by legal scholars, trauma specialists, forensic psychologists, and forensic psychiatrists. The condition was termed "posttraumatic stress disorder" in the DSM-III (1980). 

Professional discussions and debates in academic journals, at conferences, and between thought leaders, led to a more clearly-defined set of diagnostic criteria in DSM-IV (1994), particularly the definition of a "traumatic event". The DSM-IV classified PTSD under anxiety disorders. In the ICD-10 (first used in 1994), the spelling of the condition was "post-traumatic stress disorder".

In 2012, the researchers from the Grady Trauma Project highlighted the tendency people have to focus on the combat side of PTSD: "less public awareness has focused on civilian PTSD, which results from trauma exposure that is not combat related... " and "much of the research on civilian PTSD has focused on the sequelae of a single, disastrous event, such as the Oklahoma City bombing, September 11th attacks, and Hurricane Katrina". Disparity in the focus of PTSD research affected the already popular perception of the exclusive interconnectedness of combat and PTSD. This is misleading when it comes to understanding the implications and extent of PTSD as a neurological disorder. 

The DSM-5 (2013) created a new category called "trauma and stressor-related disorders", in which PTSD is now classified.

America's 2014 National Comorbidity Survey reports that "the traumas most commonly associated with PTSD are combat exposure and witnessing among men and rape and sexual molestation among women."

Terminology 

The Diagnostic and Statistical Manual of Mental Disorders does not hyphenate "post" and "traumatic", thus, the DSM-5 lists the disorder as posttraumatic stress disorder. However, many scientific journal articles and other scholarly publications do hyphenate the name of the disorder, viz., "post-traumatic stress disorder". Dictionaries also differ with regard to the preferred spelling of the disorder with the Collins English Dictionary – Complete and Unabridged using the hyphenated spelling, and the American Heritage Dictionary of the English Language, Fifth Edition and the Random House Kernerman Webster's College Dictionary giving the non-hyphenated spelling.

Some authors have used the terms "post-traumatic stress syndrome" or "post-traumatic stress symptoms" ("PTSS"), or simply "post-traumatic stress" ("PTS") in the case of the U.S. Department of Defense, to avoid stigma associated with the word "disorder".

The comedian George Carlin criticized the euphemism treadmill which led to progressive change of the way PTSD was referred to over the course of the 20th century, from "shell shock" in the First World War to the "battle fatigue" in the Second World War, to "operational exhaustion" in the Korean War, to the current "post-traumatic stress disorder", coined during the Vietnam War, which "added a hyphen" and which, he commented, "completely burie[s] [the pain] under jargon". He also stated that the name given to the condition has had a direct effect on the way veteran soldiers with PTSD were treated and perceived by civilian populations over time.

Research 
Most knowledge regarding PTSD comes from studies in high-income countries.

To recapitulate some of the neurological and neurobehavioral symptoms experienced by the veteran population of recent conflicts in Iraq and Afghanistan, researchers at the Roskamp Institute and the James A Haley Veteran's Hospital (Tampa) have developed an animal model to study the consequences of mild traumatic brain injury (mTBI) and PTSD. In the laboratory, the researchers exposed mice to a repeated session of unpredictable stressor (i.e. predator odor while restrained), and physical trauma in the form of inescapable foot-shock, and this was also combined with a mTBI. In this study, PTSD animals demonstrated recall of traumatic memories, anxiety, and an impaired social behavior, while animals subject to both mTBI and PTSD had a pattern of disinhibitory-like behavior. mTBI abrogated both contextual fear and impairments in social behavior seen in PTSD animals. In comparison with other animal studies, examination of neuroendocrine and neuroimmune responses in plasma revealed a trend toward increase in corticosterone in PTSD and combination groups.

Stellate ganglion block is an experimental procedure for the treatment of PTSD.

Researchers are investigating a number of experimental FAAH and MAGL-inhibiting drugs of hopes of finding a better treatment for anxiety and stress-related illnesses. In 2016, the FAAH-inhibitor drug BIA 10-2474 was withdrawn from human trials in France due to adverse effects.

Preliminary evidence suggests that MDMA-assisted psychotherapy might be an effective treatment for PTSD. However, it is important to note that the results in clinical trials of MDMA-assisted psychotherapy might be substantially influenced by expectancy effects given the unblinding of participants. Furthermore, there is a lack of trials comparing MDMA-assisted psychotherapy to existent first-line treatments for PTSD, such as trauma-focused psychological treatments, which seems to achieve similar or even better outcomes than MDMA-assisted psychotherapy.

Psychotherapy 
Trauma-focused psychotherapies for PTSD (also known as "exposure-based" or "exposure" psychotherapies), such as prolonged exposure therapy (PE), eye movement desensitization and reprocessing (EMDR), and cognitive-reprocessing therapy (CPT) have the most evidence for efficacy and are recommended as first-line treatment for PTSD by almost all clinical practice guidelines. Exposure-based psychotherapies demonstrate efficacy for PTSD caused by different trauma "types", such as combat, sexual-assault, or natural disasters. At the same time, many trauma-focused psychotherapies evince high drop-out rates.

Most systematic reviews and clinical guidelines indicate that psychotherapies for PTSD, most of which are trauma-focused therapies, are more effective than pharmacotherapy (medication), although there are reviews that suggest exposure-based psychotherapies for PTSD and pharmacotherapy are equally effective. Interpersonal psychotherapy shows preliminary evidence of probable efficacy, but more research is needed to reach definitive conclusions.

Notes

References

External links 

 
 Post traumatic stress disorder information from The National Child Traumatic Stress Network
 Information resources from The University of Queensland School of Medicine
 APA practice parameters for assessment and treatment for PTSD (Updated 2017)
 Resources for professionals from the VA National PTSD Center
 

 
Adverse childhood experiences
Aftermath of war
History of psychology
Homelessness
Military medicine
Military personnel
Military psychiatry
Military sociology
Military veterans topics
Wikipedia neurology articles ready to translate
Stress-related disorders
Trauma types
Wikipedia medicine articles ready to translate